Roland Smet (born 18 December 1952) is a French former professional racing cyclist. He rode in the 1976 Tour de France.

References

External links
 

1952 births
Living people
French male cyclists
Sportspeople from Saint-Étienne
Cyclists from Auvergne-Rhône-Alpes